Prunus littlei is a species of tree in the family Rosaceae. It is native to mountain forests of northwestern South America. Its phenotype suggests close affinity with three other South American species of Prunus; P. debilis, P. guanaiensis and  P. wurdackii.

References

littlei
Plants described in 2007
Flora of South America
Trees of Colombia
Trees of Peru